Dondon is a town in Haiti.

Dondon may also refer to:

 Anyuy River (Khabarovsk Krai), also known as the Dondon, a tributary of the Amur River in Russia
 Stéphane Dondon (born 1977), a French basketball player
 Dondon Ampalayo (born 1963), a Filipino retired basketball player
 Dondon Hontiveros (born 1977), a Filipino basketball player

See also 
 Domdom (disambiguation)
 Don't Don, an album by Korean boy band Super Junior